The Vancouver classification is a grading system used in orthopaedics to determine management of post-operative periprosthetic femoral fractures following a hip arthroplasty.  It is named for the city Vancouver, home to the University of British Columbia where the authors of the 1995 paper worked.

Classification

References
 Orthobullets
 Wheeless Online

Bone fractures
Injuries of abdomen, lower back, lumbar spine and pelvis
Orthopedic classifications